Correios da Guiné-Bissau is the company responsible for postal service in Guinea-Bissau. It is a government-owned company whose headquarters is located in the former colonial building of Post Office, Telegraph and Telephone, in the capital city of Bissau. It was founded between 1973 and 1974 and joined the Universal Postal Union on 30 May 1974, and is a member of the International Association of Communications of Portuguese Expression.

References

Communications in Guinea-Bissau
Companies of Guinea-Bissau
Guinea-Bissau